The Center for Socialist Studies is an organizational center for the dissemination of socialist ideas and politics located in Giza, Egypt. It produces and sells left-wing theoretical books, magazines and newsletters as well as hosting public events and lectures on political issues. It receives no government or NGO funding, instead relying on financial contributions and donations from the center's members and supporters. It was founded by Kamal Khalil of the Revolutionary Socialists in the early 2000s.

References

External links 
 Center for Socialist Studies (Arabic)

Trade unions in Egypt
Advocacy groups
Egyptian revolution of 2011
Socialism in Egypt
Politics of Egypt
Organizations established in the 2000s
Revolutionary Socialists (Egypt)
2000s establishments in Egypt